Maylandia phaeos is a species of cichlid endemic to Lake Malawi where it is known from Cobue on the Mozambique coast and possibly other places along the coast.  This species can reach a length of  SL.

References

Fish of Mozambique
phaeos
Endemic fauna of Mozambique
Fish described in 1997
Taxonomy articles created by Polbot
Taxobox binomials not recognized by IUCN